Ainsworth Mill, Breightmet is a mercerising mill near the Breightmet neighborhood of Bolton, Greater Manchester. It was bought by the Lancashire Cotton Corporation in the 1940s as an attempt to develop a cotton finishing presence.

Location 
The Ainsworth estate though physically attached to Breightment is for administrative purposes  in the Metropolitan Borough of Bury. The early name Bolton le Moors described the position of the town amid the low hills on the edge of the West Pennine Moors south east of Rivington Pike (456 m). Breightmet lies on relatively flat land on west of the clough or steep-banked valley through which the Bradshaw Brook flows in a southerly direction towards the River Tonge and then the River Irwell. The geological formation around Breightmet consists of sandstones of the Carboniferous series and coal measures, to the north of Bolton Bury  road the lower coal measures are mixed with underlying Millstone Grit.

History 
The site was in use in 1850. It was reconfigured in 1893. It was driven by a condensing stationary steam engine which required a reservoir or mill lodge to contain water to condense the steam; this was filled in the 1970s. The mill took advantage of the copious soft water to engage in finishing yarn or fabric. The processes involved bleaching, mercerising and dyeing.
The industry peaked in 1912 when it produced 8 billion yards of cloth. The great war of 1914–1918 halted the supply of raw cotton, and the British government encouraged its colonies to build mills to spin and weave cotton. The war over, Lancashire never regained its markets. The independent mills were struggling. The Bank of England set up the Lancashire Cotton Corporation in 1929 to attempt to rationalise and save the industry. Ainsworth Mill, Breightmet was one of 104 mills bought last by the LCC. It one of the 53 mills that LCC owned in 1950, and was extensively refurbished to provide a mercerising facility. They established a research and quality control laboratory here to service the group and ensure the stability of the colour. Yarn was received from other mills in the group in warp or in hank, and is mercerised, bleached and dyed, then wrapped into hank, cone, quiller pirn, back beam, weaver's beam, cheese or precision wound multiple end cheese as required. On LCC demise, Ainsworth Mill continued in business as a bleaching and dyeing work until the dyeing company that went into liquidation in 2006. The works is derelict, but surveys have been done showing an intention to bring the mill back into industrial use.

Mercerisation
Mercerisation is a treatment for cotton fabric and thread that gives fabric a lustrous appearance.  The process is applied to materials like cotton or hemp. The process was devised in 1844 by John Mercer of Great Harwood, Lancashire,  who treated cotton fibres with sodium hydroxide. The treatment caused the fibres to swell, which in Mercer's version of the process shrunk the overall fabric size and made it stronger and easier to dye. In 1890 H. A. Lowe held the yarn under tension during treatment. This prevented shrinking and gave the yarn or resulting fabric a lustrous appearance.
Mercerisation alters the chemical structure of the fibre, inter-convertings from alpha-cellulose to a thermodynamically more favorable beta-cellulose polymorph thus swelling of the cell wall. This increases the surface area and reflectance, and gives the fibre a softer feel.

Architecture 
A ten bay three storey early mill, with triple pitch roof and one internal stair column. The engine house is separate and possesses a square chimney.

Owners
 Blackshaw Dyeing and Finishing Co
 Ainsworth Mercerising Co
 Lancashire Cotton Corporation (1930's-1964)

See also 

 Textile manufacturing
 Cotton Mill

References

Bibliography

External links
 www.cottontown.org
 www.spinningtheweb.org.uk

Textile mills owned by the Lancashire Cotton Corporation